United States Numbered Highways are components of a national system of highways that is administered by the American Association of State Highway and Transportation Officials (AASHTO) and the various state departments of transportation. These U.S. Numbered Highways were initially designated on November 11, 1926, and extend throughout the contiguous United States.

There are several U.S. Highways that exist entirely within one state. Since  the current policy on numbering and designating US Highways was written in 1991, AASHTO has been in the process of eliminating all intrastate U.S. Highways under  in length, "as rapidly as the State Highway Department and the Standing Committee on Highways of the American Association of State Highway and Transportation Officials can reach agreement with reference thereto"; new additions to the system must therefore serve more than one state.


List

See also

 List of Interstate Highways

Notes

References

External links
 Endpoints of US Highways, from Dale Sanderson (www.usends.com)
 US Highway Endings, from Adam Froehlig (www.ajfroggie.com)

U.S.